Sina Hospital Mashhad is a private hospital located in Mashhad, Iran and currently has a capacity of 128 beds. It was located on the square of end of former Shah Reza Ave. (now: Ayatollah Behjat - Ayatollah Khaz'ali - Akhoond e Khorasani) and continue to Jahad and Shahid Tavallayi Ave. .

References

External links
 

Hospitals in Iran
Buildings and structures in Mashhad